Backney Halt railway station was a request stop in the English county of Herefordshire. It was located on the Great Western Railway line linking Ross-on-Wye and Hereford.

History
Opened by the Great Western Railway, the station then passed on to the Western Region of British Railways on nationalisation in 1948. It closed in 1962, two years before the actual railway was closed to passengers in 1964.

See also
List of crossings of the River Wye

References

 Backney Halt on navigable 1946 O. S. map

Further reading

Former Great Western Railway stations
Disused railway stations in Herefordshire
Railway stations in Great Britain closed in 1962
Railway stations in Great Britain opened in 1933